Alison Jane Seabeck (née Ward, 20 January 1954) is a former British politician. A member of the Labour Party, she served as the Member of Parliament (MP) for Plymouth Devonport from 2005 until 2010 when she won the new seat of Plymouth Moor View, before losing the seat to Johnny Mercer of the Conservative Party at the 2015 general election. In opposition, Seabeck was a shadow Housing and Defence Minister.

Early life
Before her marriage, Seabeck was known as Alison Ward. She is the daughter of Michael Ward, a former Labour member of parliament for Peterborough, and was educated at the Harold Hill Grammar School in Harold Hill, Havering, London, and the North East London Polytechnic in Stratford (now the University of East London). Seabeck was a member of the MSF Union (now Unite), and while working as a researcher at the House of Commons became the secretary of the South Thames Community Branch. In 2005 she was also a member of the feminist Fawcett Society and the Labour Women's Network.

Political career
In March 2005, Seabeck was selected from an all-women shortlist to stand for Labour in the Plymouth Devonport seat.

She was elected at the 2005 general election with a majority of 8,103, replacing David Jamieson. From 2007 to 2008 she served as a Government Whip attached to the Department for Business, Enterprise and Regulatory Reform. She chaired the South West Regional Select Committee between 2009 and 2010 and sat on the Local Government Select Committee and the Regulatory Reform Select Committee between 2005 and 2007.  Between 2006 and 2007, and again from 2008 to 2009, she was Parliamentary Private Secretary to Geoff Hoon.

At the 2010 general election, Seabeck successfully held her seat in Plymouth Moor View. The Times Guide to the House of Commons 2010 described her as having a "very low profile".

On 11 October 2010, Seabeck was appointed Shadow Housing Minister, working with Caroline Flint, the then Shadow Secretary of State for Communities and Local Government. On 7 October 2011, she was appointed Shadow Defence Minister during Ed Miliband's reshuffle.

In December 2010, it was revealed that Seabeck was under investigation by the Parliamentary Commissioner for Standards in relation to declaration of member's interests. Seabeck was subsequently asked to apologise for speaking in a debate on fire safety without declaring that her partner, MP Nick Raynsford was a member of the Fire Protection Association.

She was also a member of the Public Bill Committee for the Defence Reform Act 2014

In 2014, she tried to introduce an exemption from the so-called 'bedroom tax' so that victims of domestic violence with a "panic room" installed were no longer penalised for the additional room.

At the 2015 general election, Seabeck again stood in Plymouth Moor View, but was defeated by the Conservative candidate Johnny Mercer.

Personal life
Alison Ward married Denis G. Seabeck in September 1975 in the London Borough of Havering. They have two daughters. On 5 October 2012, at the National Maritime Museum, she married Nick Raynsford, the Labour MP for Greenwich & Woolwich, for whom she had worked as a researcher before entering Parliament. They were reported to have been together for six years before marrying.

References

External links
 Alison Seabeck MP – for Plymouth, Devonport
 
 Guardian Unlimited Politics – Ask Aristotle: Alison Seabeck MP
 Meet the MP (BBC 2005)

1954 births
Living people
Labour Party (UK) MPs for English constituencies
UK MPs 2005–2010
UK MPs 2010–2015
Female members of the Parliament of the United Kingdom for English constituencies
Members of the Parliament of the United Kingdom for constituencies in Devon
People from Dagenham
21st-century British women politicians
Politicians from Plymouth, Devon
Spouses of British politicians